The Beisel was a cyclecar manufactured in Monroe, Michigan, by the Beisel Motorette Company in 1914. The Beisel used a four-cylinder water-cooled Prugh 1.5L engine and had a friction transmission connected to the rear wheels by drive belts. The Beisel cost $385. The company had signed a contract with the National United Service Company of Detroit for them to sell the Motorette for two years, but this plan was short-lived. Frank McPhillips, designer of the Beisel, claimed he was being frozen out of the company, and asked for the company to be placed in receivership, which was granted.

See also
Brass Era car

References

Defunct motor vehicle manufacturers of the United States
Motor vehicle manufacturers based in Michigan
Cyclecars
Defunct manufacturing companies based in Michigan